Iván Chapela López (born 21 May 1999) is a Spanish footballer who plays as a left winger for Unionistas de Salamanca CF, on loan from Cádiz CF.

Club career
Born in Chiclana de la Frontera, Cádiz, Andalusia, Chapela joined Valencia CF's youth setup at the age of 13, from APA Sancti Petri. In 2017, after struggling with injuries, he left the club and moved to Málaga CF.

Chapela made his senior debut with Málaga's B-team on 22 February 2018, coming on as a late substitute for goalscorer Jaime Moreno in a 2–1 Tercera División home win over Loja CD. On 1 August, he signed a three-year contract with Cádiz CF, being initially assigned to the reserves also in the fourth division.

On 15 January 2021, after becoming a regular starter for the B-team, Chapela renewed his contract with Cádiz until 2022. He made his first team – and La Liga – debut on 2 October, replacing Jens Jønsson in a 0–0 home draw against Valencia CF.

On 1 September 2022, Chapela was loaned to Primera Federación side Unionistas de Salamanca CF for the season.

References

External links
 
 
 

1999 births
Living people
People from Chiclana de la Frontera
Sportspeople from the Province of Cádiz
Spanish footballers
Footballers from Andalusia
Association football wingers
La Liga players
Segunda División B players
Segunda Federación players
Tercera División players
Atlético Malagueño players
Cádiz CF B players
Cádiz CF players
Unionistas de Salamanca CF players
Spain youth international footballers